Sargocentron coruscum, more commonly known as the reef squirrelfish, is a member of the family Holocentridae native to the western Atlantic Ocean from Florida, USA to northern South America. It is a nocturnal predator, feeding primarily on shrimps, but will also eat crabs. It searches for food alone or in small schools. It can reach sizes of up to  TL. When alarmed, it will hide in crevices between corals.

References

External links
 
 
 

coruscum
Fish described in 1860
Fish of the Atlantic Ocean